Courgenay is a commune in the Yonne department in Bourgogne-Franche-Comté in north-central France. The former Vauluisant Abbey is situated in the commune.

See also
Communes of the Yonne department

References

Communes of Yonne